The North Albany Football and Sporting Club, more often referred to as North Albany, is an Australian rules football club located in Albany, Western Australia. Nicknamed the roos, the club play in the Great Southern Football League, with home games being hosted at Collingwood Park. Since being formed in 1897, netball and association football teams have played under banners of North Albany or Kangas.

History

On 13 May 1897 football players from the North Ward formed a club called the North Albany Football Club. Wearing the colours of red and blue, the side played their inaugural matches at the Parade Street Oval. In 1908, North Albany competed in Albany's first formal football competition. North Albany entered the history books after claiming the first Premiership. It was in this season that the club altered their colours, with the team wearing red and white hooped guernseys.

In the late 1930s, the North Albany Football Club enjoyed a period of success. From 1936 until 1939, the club won continual Premiership flags. The club competed in their fifth successive Grand Final in 1939, only to lose the encounter.

Reformation after WWII the club altered their identity. This change came in the form of the club name, with Towns FC being adopted as the new moniker. This title would be dropped in 1956, with North Albany resuming as the club's official name.

Football in the Albany region had a massive overhaul in 1958 with the formation of The Southern Districts National Football League. Nineteen years later, in 1977, the North Albany Football Club move into a new home at Collingwood Park. The following season, the 'Fighting Kangaroo' became the club mascot. The aesthetic reconfiguration of the Kangas was followed with success. Another period of sustained dominance started with North Albany's 1979 Southern Districts National Football League Grand Final. Despite losing the 1979 finale, the club would go on to compete in five straight Grand Finals, winning the 1980, 1982, and 1983 editions.

In 1991 the league had an overhaul. The new titled Great Southern Football League included teams from neighbouring townships. Clubs in the GSFL represented Katanning, Mount Barker, Tambellup and Denmark.

Alan Barnett, who had played for the club in 1972 and 1973 when injury prevented him from playing on, served as Club President from 1998 to 2007, when he was awarded life membership.

After a period of dominance from cross-town rivals Royals, 2005 saw a resurgence for the Kangas. The club won four back-to-back Flags, ending a 22-year Premiership drought.

Russell Hare was President of the Club in 2007.

Records and Achievements

Premierships

League: 29:

Reserves: 19:

Colts: 26:

Under 16's: 1:

League Club Fairest & Best

Kleemann Medalists

League Leading Goalkicker

Charlie Punch Medal (Reserves Fairest & Best)

Reserves Leading Goalkicker

Rod Gillies Medal (Colts Fairest & Best)

AFL players

2016: Darcy Cameron was drafted to the Sydney Swans

2015: Declan Mountford was drafted to North Melbourne

2014: Mitch McGovern was drafted to Adelaide

2012: Marley Williams was drafted to Collingwood

2012: Josh Bootsma was drafted to Carlton

2010: Jeremy McGovern was drafted by the West Coast Eagles in the 2011 rookie draft.

Former AFL players Tarkyn Lockyer (Collingwood) and Ryan Brabazon (Sydney),started their football careers playing for the Kangas.

Former AFL players Allen Daniels (Footscray & WA), Brad Wira (Footscray, Fremantle & WA), Brad Bootsma (Fremantle & WA) and Bill Shenfield (Fitzroy) have all played football in the red and white.

WAFL players

Some significant WAFL players that have played at the North Albany Football Club include Ron Boucher (Swan Districts & WA), Peter Stephen (East Fremantle & WA), Stuart Hillier (West Perth & WA), Ray Nott (Claremont & WA), Doug Roberts (Claremont) and Matt Orzel (Claremont).

Other notable players

One time Kangas player and footballing nomad Trevor Sutton played in WA, SA, Qld, NSW, Victoria and North Territory, representing both Queensland and NSW at state level. In 1982, playing for Deniliquin in the Murray Football League (NSW) Sutton kicked 249 goals, an Australian record.

Gordon Collis ex-Carlton player and Brownlow medalist coached the North Albany Football Club for two years, winning a Premiership in 1969.

AFL pre-season games
In 2003 the West Coast Eagles held a pre-season Community Camp in Albany, using Collingwood Park for training and practise games during their stay.

In 2008 Collingwood Park hosted a pre-season AFL game between West Coast and Collingwood, drawing a big crowd.

Other sports and related clubs

The Collingwood Park Cricket Club, which calls Collingwood Park home, is a hugely successful club in the region winning many A Grade and B Grade premierships.  In recent years the Collingwood Park CC A Grade has won titles in 2007-08, 2006–07, 2005-06 and 2003-04

The newly formed North Albany Bears Soccer Club, made up of predominately NAFC players, won the Albany Soccer Association Trophy in its first year of competition.

References

 
Sport in Albany, Western Australia
1897 establishments in Australia
Australian rules football clubs established in 1897